Beartooth is an American hardcore punk band formed by Caleb Shomo in Columbus, Ohio, in 2012. They have been signed to Red Bull Records since 2013. Their debut EP Sick was released on July 26, 2013, followed by their debut full-length album Disgusting on June 10, 2014. Their second album Aggressive was released on June 3, 2016. Their third album Disease was released on September 28, 2018. Their fourth album Below was released on June 25, 2021.

History

Formation and Sick (2012–2014)

Caleb Shomo began writing Beartooth songs while he was still in Attack Attack!. His project was originally called "Noise," but was switched to Beartooth upon realization the name was already taken. He named the band after Bear Tooth Court, where their original bassist Nick Reed grew up. Shomo has stated that Beartooth was supposed to be a mere distraction while he was still a member of Attack Attack! and nothing beyond that, having no intentions to record or play live music; however, after his departure from Attack Attack!, he then focused on the project and admitted that this band has surpassed his wildest expectations and has done everything he has ever wanted to do. He recruited guitarist Taylor Lumley, bassist Nick Reed, and drummer Brandon Mullins for live performances.

Shomo said that "Set Me on Fire" was the first Beartooth song ever written, followed by "I Have a Problem". These songs, as well as "Go Be the Voice" and "Pick Your Poison", were released online in December 2012. After uploading a live music video for "I Have a Problem", Beartooth announced a string of one-off dates that brought them right into fans living rooms, mostly in the Midwest, following the buzz surrounding the band's live performance in the "I Have a Problem" live video. They played a date on the 2013 Vans Warped Tour and were featured on the entire 2015 tour.

On June 7, 2013, Shomo announced that Beartooth was now signed to Red Bull Records. They released their debut EP Sick for free on their website on July 26, 2013, with Shomo singing, producing and playing all instruments on the record. On August 17, 2013, the band released a video for "I Have a Problem", not to be confused with the earlier live version. On December 18, 2013, the band were confirmed for the Warped Tour 2014. On November 14, the band released a music video for the song "Go Be the Voice".

Disgusting and line-up changes (2014–2015)

On January 6, 2014, Kamron Bradbury, formerly of City Lights was announced as the new rhythm guitarist. In early 2014, Nick Reed left Beartooth and was replaced with Oshie Bichar of City Lights for a U.S. tour with Memphis May Fire throughout February and March.

On April 29, 2014, Beartooth released a live music video for their new song, "Dead" set to appear on their forthcoming album, Disgusting. On May 13, 2014, it was announced through Facebook the release date for the debut full-length album, Disgusting, as June 10, 2014, along with its track listing. The first single for the album was released on the same day, titled "Beaten In Lips", along with its music video. The album was available to stream online a day before its release. As with Beartooth's debut EP, Shomo sang, produced, and played all instruments on Disgusting, except for "In Between", co-produced by John Feldmann.

Beartooth participated in the Warped Tour 2014 throughout July to early August in order to promote the album. In Europe they embarked on their first headlining tour while it was also announced that they would tour as support to Pierce the Veil and Sleeping With Sirens. In August it was announced that they would also be headlining in their first ever North America tour throughout October with support acts Vanna, Sirens & Sailors, Sylar and Alive Like Me. In February 2015 they toured the United Kingdom in support of Don Broco, We Are the In Crowd and Bury Tomorrow as part of that year's Kerrang! Tour. In March Beartooth will tour across America in a series of 'DIY venues' and house shows some of which are secret, with support act Ghost Key, stating that it is a means of giving back to their fans and that they love the experience performing in a house, much like how the band first toured. In May the band's single 'I Have a Problem' was a confirmed track for the then-upcoming game Guitar Hero Live. From May and early June they toured the UK with support from The Color Morale and Dead Harts, also performing at the Slam Dunk and Download festivals.

Aggressive and line-up changes (2015–2018)
It was made known by Caleb Shomo that the band are working on new material via his Instagram in August, however a release date was not mentioned. In August the band performed at Reading and Leeds, later supporting heavy metal band Slipknot along with Suicidal Tendencies in North America and Canada in October, and toured as a headline act in the UK in November. On April Fools' Day the band released a "swingcore jazz" version of their song "Dead" as a prank to fans stating that it was brand new material, however they did state that the album's recording had finished in March and would be released later this year. On April 4 the band announced that they had parted ways with their drummer Brandon Mullins on good terms and wished the best for him, they also assured fans that this would not interfere with upcoming tours with former Being as an Ocean's drummer Connor Dennis stepping-in in a touring capacity. 
The band will be touring as headline act from early March to mid May with a variety of support acts; Silent Planet, Ghost Key, Stray from the Path, My Ticket Home and Former on mixed dates and has been announced as one of the performers of Download Festival 2016.

On April 16, 2016, it was leaked that Beartooth will release Aggressive on June 3. The band later confirmed the album title and premiered its title track on Sirius XM's Octane channel that day.

Disease (2018–2019) 

In April 2018, guitarist Taylor Lumley departed the band to pursue other avenues, his replacement was announced in June 2018 with ex-Like Moths to Flames guitarist Zach Huston joining Beartooth full time. It was also announced session/studio drummer Connor Denis had joined the band as their full time drummer. On July 18, the songs "Infection", "Disease", and "Believe" leaked online forcing the band to reveal the name of their new album, Disease, the tracklisting and its artwork. On September 28, Beartooth released their third studio album "Disease".

On May 10, 2019, Beartooth released the EP B-Sides, consisting of two unused songs from the album Disease.

On October 25, 2019, the band released a Deluxe Edition of Disease which featured the two songs from their B-Sides EP, two new tracks titled "Young" and "Threat to Society" as well as two live performances from their Rock am Ring set.

Line-up changes and Below (2020–present)
On May 24, 2020, Beartooth announced that their longtime guitarist Kamron Bradbury was leaving the band for personal reasons. On June 23, Shomo said that the band's fourth album, which he referred to as "LP4", was being recorded at Capital House Studio in Ohio. On December 8, Shomo stated on a Twitch stream in that he was "aiming for an album release by spring 2021" and that singles would "definitely" be released before then. On December 18, the band released a remixed/remastered version of the band's second studio album Aggressive with added vocal layers and instrumentation.

On March 19, 2021, the band surprise released a new song called "Devastation" which saw their sound deviate from their metalcore roots, in favour of a hard rock/heavy metal feel. A week later the band released "The Past Is Dead" and revealed the new album will be titled Below. It was also announced guitar tech Will Deely had become the band's new guitarist. On May 21, one month before the album release, the band released the fourth single "Fed Up" which frontman Caleb Shomo revealed "was written mid lockdown" in 2020 during, and about the COVID-19 lockdowns. On June 25, Beartooth officially released their fourth studio album Below. On 12 July 2022, the band released the brand new single "Riptide" along with an accompanying music video.

Musical style
Beartooth's style has mainly been described as metalcore, hardcore punk, hard rock, and melodic hardcore. Beartooth's style on both their EP Sick and their album Disgusting has mainly been described as metalcore, but with more prominent punk rock influences than the style of Caleb Shomo's previous band Attack Attack! and without the electronic elements that Attack Attack! employed. Reviewers have also highlighted his emphasis on catchy choruses. Chad Childers of Loudwire commented that "the former Attack Attack! rocker [Shomo]... is delivering a mix of metalcore and old-school punk on his new band's Disgusting album", while Rock Sound described Beartooth as "mix[ing] metalcore with nu metal and... massive choruses", Kory Grow of Rolling Stone wrote that compared to Attack Attack!, the "smarter, leaner Beartooth have anteed up the aggression with poppy hooks and slinky hardcore riffing" and Justin Mabee of HM Magazine said of Disgusting: "while much of the album tends to focus on two-steps, thrash and hardcore, Shomo came from a place where catchiness was in every song". Shomo was also named one of Alternative Press "15 best screamers in modern metalcore" in February 2014. Another source called the band nu metal revival.

Shomo himself commented on his intentions with Beartooth's style in an interview with Alternative Press in January 2013, when Sick had not been released yet, saying: "We just want to make fun, punk-rock, hardcore, wild music, play crazy shows and have a good time without any pressure from anything". When asked about the absence of electronic elements, which he has often worked with, from his new music, he stated: "I don't want any electronics in Beartooth. It is very hardcore and punk roots sounding. I have my electronic thing and I have this more hardcore thing, and I don't want those things to bleed into each other musically." In an interview with Kerrang! Shomo stated that he does not intend to change the band's sound on their second album, and that it will be dark and intense like their debut.

Members
Current members
 Caleb Shomo – lead vocals, all studio instruments (2012–present)
 Oshie Bichar – bass, backing vocals (2014–present)
 Connor Denis – drums, backing vocals (2018–present; touring 2016–2018)
 Zach Huston – lead guitar, backing vocals (2018–present)
 Will Deely – rhythm guitar, backing vocals (2021–present; touring 2019, 2020)

Former members
 Nick Reed – bass, backing vocals (2013–2014)
 Brandon Mullins – drums (2013–2016)
 Taylor Lumley – lead guitar, backing vocals (2013–2018); rhythm guitar (2013–2014)
 Kamron Bradbury – rhythm guitar (2014–2020)

Timeline

Discography

Studio albums
Disgusting (2014)
Aggressive (2016)
Disease (2018)
Below (2021)

Accolades

References

External links

 

Articles which contain graphical timelines
2012 establishments in Ohio
Metalcore musical groups from Ohio
Hardcore punk groups from Ohio
Heavy metal musical groups from Ohio
Musical groups established in 2012
Musical groups from Columbus, Ohio
Musical quintets